William Leahy  was an Anglican priest in Ireland during the 19th century.

Leahy was born in Dublin educated at Trinity College there. The Rector of Moylough, he was Archdeacon of Killala from 1850 to 1874.

Notes

Alumni of Trinity College Dublin
Church of Ireland priests
19th-century Irish Anglican priests
Archdeacons of Killala